The Perry Mill is a historic mill building at 337 Thames Street in Newport, Rhode Island.  It is a large five-story stone structure on the Newport waterfront.  It was built in 1835 by master stonemason Alexander MacGregor (who also oversaw the construction of Fort Adams in Newport) as part of an initiative to boost the city's flagging economy.  Of the four mills built in the 1830s only this one and the Newport Steam Factory survive.  This building was originally four stories when built. 

It was added to the National Register of Historic Places in 1972. The building now houses a club and hotel.

See also
National Register of Historic Places listings in Newport County, Rhode Island

References

External links

 Northeast Collaborative Architects, http://ncarchitects.com/portfolio/item/the-newport-bay-club-at-perry-mill-%E2%80%A2-newport-ri/
 Newport Bay Club and Hotel

Industrial buildings and structures on the National Register of Historic Places in Rhode Island
Industrial buildings completed in 1835
Buildings and structures in Newport, Rhode Island
Historic American Buildings Survey in Rhode Island
Cotton mills in the United States
National Register of Historic Places in Newport, Rhode Island